Marisela Peralta (born 21 December 1955) is a Dominican Republic hurdler. She competed in the women's 100 metres hurdles at the 1980 Summer Olympics.

References

1955 births
Living people
Athletes (track and field) at the 1975 Pan American Games
Athletes (track and field) at the 1979 Pan American Games
Athletes (track and field) at the 1980 Summer Olympics
Dominican Republic female hurdlers
Olympic athletes of the Dominican Republic
Pan American Games competitors for the Dominican Republic
Place of birth missing (living people)
Central American and Caribbean Games medalists in athletics